Miss Universe 1980, the 29th Miss Universe pageant, was held on 8 July 1980 at the Sejong Cultural Center in Seoul, South Korea. It was the first time in the pageant's history that the event was held in South Korea. Shawn Weatherly from the United States was crowned by Maritza Sayalero of Venezuela. Sixty-nine contestants competed in this year.

Results

Placements

Final Competition

Special Awards 

Order Of Announcements

Top 12

 

 

Top 5

Contestants

  – Silvia Piedrabuena
  – Magaly Maduro
  – Katrina Redina
  – Isabel Muller
  – Darlene Davies
  – Brigitte Billen
  – Ellen Marie Clarke
  – Jill Murphy
  – Carmen Sonia Pereira Parada
  – Eveline Schroeter
  – Barbara Stevens
  – Teresa Lynn McKay
  – Dealia Devon Walter
  – María Gabriela Campusano Puelma
  – Maria Patricia Arbeláez
  – Barbara Herrero
  – Hassana Hamoud
  – Jane Bill
  – Milagros Germán
  – Verónica Rivas
  – Julie Duckworth
  – Sirpa Viljamaa
  – Brigitte Choquet
  – Kathrin Glotzl
  – Roula Kanellapoulou
  – Elydie de Gage
  – Dina Aportadera
  – Lizabeth Iveth Martínez Noack
  – Karin Gooyer
  – Etelvina Raudales Velásquez
  – Wanda Tai
  – Guðbjörg Sigurdardóttir
  – Sangeeta Motilal Bijlani
  – Andi Nana Riwayate
  – Maura McMenamim
  – Ilana Shoshan
  – Loredana Del Santo
  – Hisae Hiyama
  – Kim Eun-jung
  – Felicia Yong
  – Isabelle Zammit
  – Ana Patricia Nuñez Romero
  – Diana Delyse Nottle
  – Angelina Camacho Chong
  – Maiken Nielsen
  – Gloria Karamañites
  – Mispah Alwyn
  – Martha Galli
  – Mariailce Ramis
  – Maria Rosario Silayan †
  – Agnes Tañón Correa
  – Marie Josephe Hoareau
  – Lucie Marie Davic
  – Linda Gallagher
  – Ann Chua Ai Choo
  – Yolanda Hoyos
  – Hyacinth Kurukulasuriya
  – Eva Birgitta Andersson
  – Margrit Kilchoer
  Tahiti – Thilda Raina Fuller
  – Artitaya Promkul
  – Althea Rocke
  – Heyecan Gokoglou
  – Constance Lightbourne
  – Beatriz Antuñez
  – Shawn Weatherly
  – Deborah Mardenborough
  – Maye Brandt † 
  – Kim Ashfield

Celebrity judges 
 George Maharis - actor
 Ron Duguay - NHL player/actor
 Yoshi Hara
 Eileen Ford
 Dong Kingman
 Margaret Gardiner - Miss Universe 1978 winner
 Richard Roundtree
 Max Boston
 Abigail Van Buren

Notes

Debuts

Withdrawals

 
 
  - Jacobeth Lolo Matale wasn't granted visa to South Korea.

  - Margaret Singh
 - Christiane Carol MacKay

 - Jenny Kay wasn't granted visa to South Korea.
 - due to the military coup in the country
 - Lindelwa Myataza wasn't granted visa to South Korea.

Returns 
Last competed in 1977:
 
 
 
Last competed in 1978:

Did not compete 

  - Georgia Christodolidou
 
  - Bernice Tembo wasn't granted visa to South Korea.

General references

External links

 Miss Universe official website

1980
1980 in South Korea
1980 beauty pageants
Beauty pageants in South Korea
1980s in Seoul
Events in Seoul
July 1980 events in Asia